John Maynard Keynes (1883–1946), British economist, founder of modern macroeconomics.

Keynes may refer to the following:

People with the surname Keynes 

 John Neville Keynes (1852–1949), British economist and father of John Maynard Keynes
 Milo Keynes (1924–2009), English doctor and author
 Quentin Keynes (1921–2003), British traveller and bibliophile
 Randal Keynes (born 1948), English author
 Richard Darwin Keynes (1919–2010), English physiologist
 Simon Keynes, (born 1952), British author
 Skandar Keynes (born 1991), British actor and political adviser, son of Randal
 Soumaya Keynes (born 1989), British radio actor, daughter of Randal

Placenames in England containing the name Keynes 

 Ashton Keynes, a village in Wiltshire
 Coombe Keynes, a hamlet in Dorset
 Horsted Keynes, a village in West Sussex
 Milton Keynes, a city in Buckinghamshire
 Somerford Keynes, a village in Gloucestershire
 Poole Keynes, a thriving village in the heart of the Cotswolds.

Other 

 Keynesian economics, a school of economic thought based on the ideas of John Maynard Keynes
 Keynes College, Kent, a college of the University of Kent, named after John Maynard Keynes
 John Maynard Keynes, a boat owned by fictional economist Meyer, friend of the John D. MacDonald character Travis McGee